

F

Fa – Fe 

 

 

Fabianite (IMA1967 s.p., 1962) 6.FC.20    (CaB3O5(OH))
Fabrièsite (zeolitic tectosilicate: IMA2012-080) 9.G?.  [no]  
Faheyite (Y: 1953) 8.CA.15    (IUPAC: diberyllium manganese(II) diiron(III) tetraphosphate hexahydrate)
Fahleite (smolianinovite: IMA1982-061) 8.CH.55    (IUPAC: calcium pentazinc diiron(III) hexarsenate tetradecahydrate)
Fairbankite (tellurite: IMA1979-003) 4.JK.50    (IUPAC: lead tellurite)
Fairchildite (fairchildite: 1947) 5.AC.20    (IUPAC: dipotassium calcium dicarbonate)
Fairfieldite (fairfieldite: 1879) 8.CG.05    (IUPAC: dicalcium manganese(II) diphosphate dihydrate)
Faizievite (IMA2006-037) 9.CM.10   
Falcondoite (sepiolite: IMA1976-018) 9.EE.25   
Falgarite (IMA2018-069) 7.0  [no] [no] (IUPAC: tetrapotassium trivanadyl pentasulfate)
Falkmanite (Y: 1940) 2.HC.15   [no]  (IUPAC: trilead diantimonide hexasulfide) Note: possibly a lead-rich variety of boulangerite.
Falottaite (IMA2013-044) 10.AB.  [no] [no] (IUPAC: manganese oxalate trihydrate)
Falsterite (IMA2011-061) 8.0  [no] [no]
Famatinite (stannite: 1873) 2.KA.10    (IUPAC: tricopper antimonide tetrasulfide)
Fanfaniite (calcioferrite: IMA2018-053) 8.0  [no] [no] (IUPAC: tetracalcium manganese tetraluminium tetrahydro hexaphosphate dodecahydrate)
Fangite (IMA1991-047) 2.KA.15    (IUPAC: trithallium arsenide tetrasulfide)
Fantappièite (cancrinite: IMA2008-006) 9.FB.05  [no] [no]
Farneseite (cancrinite-sodalite: IMA2004-043) 9.FB.05   
Farringtonite (IMA1967 s.p., 1961) 8.AB.05    (IUPAC: trimagnesium diphosphate)
Fassinaite (thiosulphate: IMA2011-048) 7.0  [no]  (IUPAC: dilead carbonate thiosulphate)
Faujasite (zeolitic tectosilicate) 9.GD.30
Faujasite-Ca (IMA1997 s.p., 1982) 9.GD.30   [no]
Faujasite-Mg (IMA1997 s.p., 1975) 9.GD.30   [no]
Faujasite-Na (IMA1997 s.p., 1842) 9.GD.30   
Faustite (Y: 1953) 8.DD.15    (IUPAC: zinc hexaluminium octahydro tetraphosphate tetrahydrate)
Favreauite (IMA2014-013) 4.0  [no] [no] (PbBiCu6O4(SeO3)4(OH)·H2O)
Fayalite (olivine: 1840) 9.AC.05    (IUPAC: diiron(II) (tetraoxo silicate))
Fedorite (gyrolite: IMA1967 s.p., 1965) 9.EE.80   
Fedorovskite (IMA1975-006) 6.DA.25    (Ca2Mg2B4O7(OH)6)
Fedotovite (IMA1986-013) 7.BC.30    (IUPAC: dipotassium tricopper oxotrisulfate)
Fehrite (knetasite: IMA2018-125a) 7.0  [no] [no]
Feiite (IMA2017-041a) 4.0  [no] [no] (IUPAC: diiron(II) (iron(II) titanium(IV)) pentaoxide)
Feinglosite (brackebuschite: IMA1995-013) 8.BG.05    (IUPAC: dilead zinc diarsenate monohydrate)
Feitknechtite ("O(OH)" group: IMA1968 s.p., 1965) 4.FE.25    (IUPAC: hydromanganese(III) oxide)
Feklichevite (eudialyte: IMA2000-017) 9.CO.10   [no]
Felbertalite (IMA1999-042) 2.JB.25b    (Cu2Pb6Bi8S19)
Felsőbányaite (Y: 1854) 7.DD.05    (IUPAC: tetraluminium decahydro sulfate tetrahydrate)
Fenaksite (litidionite: IMA1962 s.p., 1959) 9.DG.70    (IUPAC: potassium sodium iron(II) decaoxo tetrasilicate)
Fencooperite (IMA2000-023) 9.BH.20   [no]
Fengchengite (eudialyte: IMA2007-018a) 9.CO.  [no] [no]
Feodosiyite  (IMA2015-063) 3.0  [no] [no] (IUPAC: undecacopper dimagnesium octadecachloride octahydro hexadecahydrate)
Ferberite (wolframite: 1863) 4.DB.30    (IUPAC: iron(II) tungstate)
Ferchromide (alloy: IMA1984-022) 1.AE.15   
Ferdowsiite (sulfosalt: IMA2012-062) 2.0  [no] [no] (IUPAC: octasilver (pentaantimonide triarsenide) hexadecasulfide) 
Fergusonite-(REE) series (scheelite) 7.GA.05
Fergusonite-(Ce)Q (1986) 7.GA.05    (IUPAC: cerium niobate (0.3)hydrate)
Fergusonite-(Nd)N (1989) 7.GA.05   
Fergusonite-(Y) (IMA1987 s.p., 1825) 7.GA.05    (IUPAC: yttrium niobate)
Fergusonite-(REE)-beta series 4.DG.10 (IUPAC: REE niobium tetraoxide)
Fergusonite-(Ce)-beta (IMA1975 s.p., 1973 Rn) 4.DG.10   
Fergusonite-(Nd)-beta (IMA1987 s.p., 1983) 4.DG.10   
Fergusonite-(Y)-beta (IMA1987 s.p., 1961) 4.DG.10   
FerhodsiteQ (pentlandite: IMA2009-056) 2.0  [no] [no] Note: possibly a distorted pentlandite derivative.
Fermiite (IMA2014-068) 7.0  [no] [no] (IUPAC: tetrasodium uranyl trisulfate trihydrate)
Fernandinite (straczekite: IMA1994 s.p., 1915 Rd) 4.HE.20   
Feroxyhyte ("O(OH)" group: IMA1975-032) 4.FE.40    (IUPAC: hydroiron(III) oxide)
Ferraioloite (IMA2015-066) 8.0  [no] [no]
Ferrarisite (lindackerite: IMA1979-020) 8.CJ.30    (IUPAC: pentacalcium di(hydroxoarsenate) diarsenate nonahydrate)
Ferriakasakaite (epidote) 9.BG.
Ferriakasakaite-(Ce) (IMA2018-087) 9.BG. [no] [no] [no]
Ferriakasakaite-(La) (IMA2013-126) 9.BG.  [no] [no]
Ferriallanite (epidote, allanite) 9.BG.05b
Ferriallanite-(Ce) (IMA2000-041) 9.BG.05b   [no]
Ferriallanite-(La) (IMA2010-066) 9.BG.05b  [no] [no]
Ferriandrosite-(La) (epidote: IMA2013-127) 9.B  [no] [no]
Ferribushmakinite (brackebushite: IMA2014-055) 8.B?.  [no] [no] (IUPAC: dilead iron(III) hydro phosphate vanadate)
Ferricerite-(La) (cerite: IMA2001-042) 9.AG.20   [no]
Ferricopiapite (copiapite: 1939) 7.DB.35   
Ferricoronadite (hollandite, coronadite: IMA2015-093) 4.DK.  [no] [no]
Ferrierite (zeolitic tectosilicate) 9.GD.50
Ferrierite-K (IMA1997 s.p., 1976) 9.GD.50   [no]
Ferrierite-Mg (IMA1997 s.p., 1918) 9.GD.50   [no]
Ferrierite-Na (IMA1997 s.p., 1976) 9.GD.50   
Ferrierite-NH4 (IMA2017-099) 9.GD.50  [no] [no]
Ferri-fluoro-katophorite [Na-Ca-amphibole: IMA2015-096, IMA2012 s.p., fluor-magnesiokatophorite (2006) Rd] 9.DE.20  [no] [no]
Ferri-fluoro-leakeite [Na-amphibole: IMA2012 s.p., fluoroleakeite (IMA2009-085) Rd] 9.DE.05  [no] 
Ferri-ghoseite [Na-(Mg-Fe-Mn)-amphibole: IMA2012 s.p., IMA2003-066 Rd] 9.DE.20   [no]
Ferri-hellandite-(Ce) (hellandite: IMA2020-085) 9.DK.  [no] [no]
Ferrihollandite (hollandite, coronadite: IMA2011-F, 1906) 4.DK.  [no] [no]
Ferrihydrite (nolanite: IMA1971-015) 4.FE.35    (IUPAC: decairon(III) dihydro tetradecaoxide)
Ferri-kaersutite [O-dominant amphibole: IMA2014-051] 9.DE.15  [no] [no]
Ferri-katophorite [Na-Ca-amphibole: IMA2012 s.p., IMA1978 s.p. Rd] 9.DE.20  [no] [no]
Ferri-leakeite [Na-amphibole: IMA2012 s.p., leakeite (IMA1991-028) Rd] 9.DE.25   
Ferrilotharmeyerite (tsumcorite: IMA1986-024) 8.CG.15    (IUPAC: calcium zinc iron(III) hydro diarsenate hydrate)
Ferrimolybdite (Y: 1907) 7.GB.30    (IUPAC: diiron trimolybdate(VI) heptahydrate)
Ferri-mottanaite-(Ce) (hellandite: IMA2017-087a) 9.0  [no] [no]
Ferrinatrite (Y: 1889) 7.CC.35    (IUPAC: trisodium iron(III) trisulfate trihydrate)
Ferri-obertiite [O-dominant amphibole: IMA2015-079] 9.DE.25  [no] [no]
Ferri-pedrizite [Li-amphibole: IMA2012 s.p., ferripedrizite (IMA1998-061) Rd] 9.DE.25   [no]
Ferriperbøeite (gatelite) 9.BG.
Ferriperbøeite-(Ce) (IMA2017-037) 9.BG.  [no] [no]
Ferriperbøeite-(La) (IMA2018-106) 9.BG.  [no] [no]
Ferriprehnite (prehnite: IMA2020-057) 9.0  [no] [no]
Ferripyrophyllite (IMA1978-062) 9.EC.10    (IUPAC: iron(III) hydropentaoxy disilicate)
Ferrirockbridgeite (rockbridgeite: IMA2018-065) 8.BC.  [no] [no]
Ferrisanidine (feldspar: IMA2019-052) 9.F  [no] [no]
Ferrisepiolite (sepiolite: IMA2010-061) 9.EE.  [no] 
Ferrisicklerite (olivine: 1937) 8.AB.10    (IUPAC: (1-x)lithium (iron(III),Mn(II)) phosphate)
Ferristrunzite (strunzite: IMA1986-023) 8.DC.25    (IUPAC: triiron(III) trihydro diphosphate pentahydrate)
Ferrisurite (surite: IMA1990-056) 9.EC.75   
FerrisymplesiteQ (symplesite: 1924) 8.CE.40    (IUPAC: triiron(III) trihydro diarsenate pentahydrate)
Ferri-taramite (Na-Ca-amphibole: IMA2021-046) 9.DE.20  [no] [no]
Ferrivauxite (vauxite: IMA2014-003) 8.0  [no] [no] (IUPAC: iron(III) dialuminium trihydro diphosphate pentahydrate)
Ferri-winchite [Na-Ca-amphibole: IMA2012 s.p., ferriwinchite (IMA2004-034) Rd] 9.DE.20   
Ferro-actinolite [Ca-amphibole: IMA2012 s.p., IMA1997 s.p., 1946 Rd] 9.DE.10   
Ferroalluaudite (alluaudite: IMA2007 s.p., 1957) 8.AC.10    (IUPAC: sodium iron(II) diiron(III) triphosphate)
Ferroaluminoceladonite (mica: IMA1995-019) 9.EC.15   [no]
Ferro-anthophyllite [Mg-Fe-Mn-amphibole: IMA2012 s.p., 1921 Rd] 9.DD.05   [no]
Ferroberaunite (beraunite: IMA2021-036) 8.DH.  [no] [no]
Ferrobobfergusonite (alluaudite, bobfergusonite: IMA2017-006) 8.0  [no] [no] (IUPAC: disodium pentairon(II) iron(III) aluminium hexaphosphate)
Ferrobustamite (wollastonite: 1937) 9.DG.05    (IUPAC: calcium iron(II) hexaoxy disilicate)
Ferrocarpholite (carpholite: 1951) 9.DB.05    (IUPAC: iron(II) dialuminium hexaoxy disilicate tetrahydroxyl)
Ferroceladonite (mica: IMA1995-018) 9.EC.15   [no]
Ferrochiavennite (zeolitic tectosilicate: IMA2012-039) 9.G?.  [no] 
Ferro-edenite [Ca-amphibole: IMA2012 s.p., 1946 Rd] 9.DE.15   
Ferroefremovite (langbeinite: IMA2019-008) 7.0  [no] [no] (IUPAC: diammonium diiron(II) trisulfate)
Ferroericssonite (ericssonite: IMA2010-025) 9.B  [no] [no] (IUPAC: barium diiron(II) iron(III) (heptaoxy disilicate) oxyhydroxyl)
Ferro-ferri-fluoro-leakeite [Na-amphibole: IMA2012 s.p., fluor-ferro-leakeite (IMA1993-026) Rd] 9.DE.25   [no]
Ferro-ferri-hornblende [Li-amphibole: IMA2015-054] 9.DE.10  [no] [no]
Ferro-ferri-katophorite [Na-Ca-amphibole: IMA2016-008] 9.DE.20  [no] [no]
Ferro-ferri-nybøite [Na-amphibole: IMA2013-072, IMA1997 s.p.] 9.DE.25  [no] [no]
Ferro-ferri-obertiite [O-dominant amphibole: IMA2012 s.p., ferro-obertiite (IMA2009-034) Rd] 9.DE.25  [no] 
Ferro-ferri-pedrizite [Li-amphibole: IMA2012 s.p., sodic-ferri-ferropedrizite (2003) Rd] 9.DE.25   [no]
Ferrofettelite (IMA2021-094)
Ferro-fluoro-edenite [Ca-amphibole: IMA2020-058] 9.DE.  [no] [no]
Ferro-fluoro-pedrizite [Li-amphibole: IMA2012 s.p., fluoro-sodic-ferropedrizite (IMA2008-070) Rd] 9.DE.25  [no] 
Ferro-gedrite [Mg-Fe-Mn-amphibole: IMA2012 s.p.,  ferrogedrite (IMA1997 s.p.), IMA1978 s.p., 1939 Rd] 9.DD.05   
Ferro-glaucophane [Na-amphibole: IMA2012 s.p., ferroglaucophane (IMA1997 s.p.), 1957 Rd] 9.DE.25   
Ferrohexahydrite (IMA1967 s.p., 1962) 7.CB.25    (IUPAC: iron(II) sulfate hexahydrate)
Ferrohögbomite-2N2S (högbomite, ferrohögbomite: IMA2001-048) 4.CB.   [no]
Ferro-holmquistite [Li-amphibole: IMA2012 s.p., ferroholmquistite (IMA2004-030) Rd] 9.DD.05   [no]
Ferro-hornblende [Ca-amphibole: IMA2012 s.p., ferrohornblende (IMA1997 s.p.), ferro-hornblende (1978) Rd] 9.DE.10   
Ferroindialite (beryl: IMA2013-016) 9.CJ.  [no] 
Ferro-katophorite [Na-Ca-amphibole: IMA2012 s.p., katophorite (1894) Rd] 9.DE.20   
Ferrokentbrooksite (eudialyte: IMA1999-046) 9.CO.10   [no]
Ferrokësterite (stannite: IMA1985-012) 2.CB.15a   
Ferrokinoshitalite (IMA1999-026) 9.EC.35   [no]
Ferrolaueite (laueite, laueite: IMA1987-046a) 8.DC.30   [no]
Ferromerrillite (whitlockite: IMA2006-039) 8.AC.45   [no]
Ferronickelplatinum (alloy: IMA1982-071) 1.AG.40    (IUPAC: diplatinum iron nickel alloy)
Ferronigerite (nigerite, ferronigerite) 4.FC.20
Ferronigerite-2N1S (IMA2001 s.p., 1947) 4.FC.20   
Ferronigerite-6N6S (IMA2001 s.p., 1947) 4.FC.20   
Ferronordite (nordite) 9.DO.15 
Ferronordite-(Ce) (IMA1997-008) 9.DO.15   [no]
Ferronordite-(La) (IMA2000-015) 9.DO.15   [no]
Ferro-pargasite [Ca-amphibole: IMA2012 s.p., ferropargasite (IMA1977 s.p.), 1961 Rd] 9.DE.15   
Ferro-pedrizite [Ca-amphibole: IMA2014-037] 9.DE.25  [no] [no]
Ferroqingheiite-(Fe2+) (alluaudite, wyllieite: IMA2009-076) 8.AC.15  [no]  (IUPAC: disodium iron(II) magnesium aluminium triphosphate)
Ferrorhodonite (rhodonite: IMA2016-016) 9.D?  [no] [no]
Ferro-richterite [Na-Ca-amphibole: IMA2012 s.p., ferrorichterite (IMA1997 s.p.), 1946 Rd] 9.DE.20   
Ferrorockbridgeite (rockbridgeite: IMA2018-004) 8.0  [no] [no]
Ferrorosemaryite (alluaudite, wyllieite: IMA2003-063) 8.AC.15    (IUPAC: vacancy sodium iron(II) (iron(III) aluminium) triphosphate)
Ferrosaponite (smectite-vermiculite: IMA2002-028) 9.EC.45   [no]
Ferroselite (marcasite: 1955) 2.EB.10a    (IUPAC: iron diselenide)
Ferrosilite (pyroxene: IMA1988 s.p., 1935) 9.DA.05    (IUPAC: iron(II) hexaoxy disilicate)
Ferroskutterudite (perovskite, skutterudite: IMA2006-032) 2.EC.05   
Ferrostalderite (routhierite: IMA2014-090) 2.0  [no] [no] (IUPAC: copper diiron thallium diarsenide hexasulfide)
Ferrostrunzite (strunzite: IMA1983-003) 8.DC.25    (IUPAC: iron(II) diiron(III) dihydro diphosphate hexahydrate)
Ferrotaaffeite (taaffeite, ferrotaaffeite) 4.FC.
Ferrotaaffeite-2N'2S (IMA2011-025) 4.FC.  [no] 
Ferrotaaffeite-6N'3S (IMA2001 s.p., IMA1979-047) 4.FC.    (IUPAC: beryllium diiron(II) hexaluminium dodecaoxide)
Ferro-taramite [Na-Ca-amphibole: IMA2012 s.p., aluminotaramite (IMA2006-023) Rd] 9.DE.20   [no]
Ferrotitanowodginite (wodginite: IMA1998-028) 4.DB.40   [no] (IUPAC: iron(II) titanium ditantalum octaoxide)
Ferrotochilinite (tochilinite: IMA2010-080) 2.0  [no]  (circa 6FeS·5[Fe(OH)2])
Ferrotorryweiserite (torryweiserite: IMA2021-055)  [no] [no]
Ferro-tschermakite (IMA2016-116, 1945) 9.DE.10    
Ferrotychite (northupite: IMA1980-050) 5.BF.05    (IUPAC: hexasodium diiron(II) tetracarbonate sulfate)
Ferrovalleriite (valleriite: IMA2011-068) 2.0  [no] 
Ferrovorontsovite (galkhaite: IMA2017-007) 2.0  [no] [no]
Ferrowodginite (wodginite: IMA1984-006) 4.DB.40    (IUPAC: iron(II) tin(IV) ditantalum octaoxide)
Ferrowyllieite (alluaudite, wyllieite: IMA1979 s.p., 1973) 8.AC.15    (IUPAC: sodium sodium iron(II) (iron(II) aluminium) triphosphate)
Ferruccite (fluoroborate: 1933) 3.CA.05    (IUPAC: sodium tetrafluoroborate)
Fersmanite (Y: 1929) 9.BE.72   
Fersmite (columbite: 1946) 4.DG.05   
Feruvite (tourmaline: IMA1987-057) 9.CK.05   
Fervanite (Y: 1931) 4.HG.05    (IUPAC: tetrairon(III) tetravanadium(V) hexadecaoxide pentahydrate)
Fetiasite (IMA1991-019) 4.JB.05   
Fettelite (IMA1994-056) 2.LA.30    ([Ag6As2S7][Ag10HgAs2S8])
Feynmanite (IMA2017-035) 7.0  [no] [no] (IUPAC: sodium uranyl hydro sulfate (3.5)hydrate)

Fi – Fl 
Fianelite (fianelite: IMA1995-016) 8.FC.05    (IUPAC: dimanganese(II) pyrovanadate dihydrate)
Fibroferrite (Y: 1833) 7.DC.15    (IUPAC: iron(III) hydro sulfate pentahydrate)
Fichtelite (Y: 1841) 10.BA.05    (IUPAC: dimethyl-isopropyl-perhydrophenanthrene)
Fiedlerite (IMA1994 s.p., 1887 Rd) 3.DC.10    (IUPAC: trilead hydro tetrachloride fluoride monohydrate)
Fiemmeite (oxalate: IMA2017-115) 10.0  [no] [no] (IUPAC: dicopper dihydro oxalate dihydrate)
Filatovite (feldspar: IMA2002-052) 8.AC.85   
Filipstadite (spinel, spinel: IMA1987-010) 04.BB.05    (IUPAC: 1/2[(iron(III) antimony(V)) tetramagnesium octaoxide])
Fillowite (fillowite: 1879) 8.AC.50    (IUPAC: disodium calcium heptamanganese(II) hexaphosphate)
Finchite (fritzscheite: IMA2017-052) 4.0  [no] [no] (IUPAC: strontium diuranyl (divanadium octaoxide) pentahydrate)
Fingerite (IMA1983-064) 8.BB.80    (IUPAC: undecacopper dioxohexavanadate)
Finnemanite (apatite: 1923) 4.JB.45    (IUPAC: pentalead chloro triarsenite(III))
Fischesserite (IMA1971-010) 2.BA.75    (IUPAC: trisilver gold diselenide)
Fivegite (IMA2009-067) 9.0  [no] 
Fizélyite (lillianite: 1913) 2.JB.40a    (IUPAC: pentasilver tetradecalead octatetracontasulfa henicosantimonide)
Flaggite (IMA2021-044) 7.DF.  [no] [no]
Flagstaffite (Y: 1920) 10.CA.10   
Flamite (IMA2013-122) 9.0  [no] [no]
Fleetite (IMA2018-073b) 2.0  [no] [no] (IUPAC: dicopper rhenium iridium diantimonide) 
Fleischerite (fleischerite: IMA1962 s.p.) 7.DF.25    (IUPAC: trilead germanium hexahydro disulfate trihydrate)
Fleisstalite (gravegliaite: IMA2016-038) 4.JE.  [no] [no] (IUPAC: iron(II) sulfite trihydrate)
Fletcherite (linnaeite, spinel: IMA1976-044) 2.DA.05    (IUPAC: copper dinickel tetrasulfide)
Flinkite (allactite: 1889) 8.BE.30    (IUPAC: dimanganese(II) manganese(III) tetrahydro arsenate)
Flinteite (IMA2014-009) 3.0  [no] [no] (IUPAC: dipotassium zinc tetrachloride)
Florencite (alunite, crandallite) 08.BL.13 (IUPAC: REE trialumino hexahydro diphosphate)
Florencite-(Ce) (IMA1987 s.p., 1900) 8.BL.13   
Florencite-(La) (IMA1987 s.p., 1980) 8.BL.13   
Florencite-(Nd) (IMA1987 s.p., 1971) 8.BL.13   
Florencite-(Sm) (IMA2009-074) 8.BL.13  [no] 
Florenskyite (phosphide: IMA1999-013) 1.BD.15   [no] (IUPAC: iron titanium phosphide)
Florensovite (linnaeite, spinel: IMA1987-012) 2.DA.05   
Flörkeite (zeolitic tectosilicate: IMA2008-036) 9.GC.10   
Fluckite (fluckite: IMA1978-054) 8.CB.15    (IUPAC: calcium manganese(II) di(hydroxoarsenate) dihydrate)
Fluellite (Y: 1824) 8.DE.10    (IUPAC: dialuminium difluoro hydro phosphate heptahydrate)
Fluoborite (Y: 1926) 6.AB.50    (IUPAC: trimagnesium trifluoro borate)
Fluocerite 3.AC.15 (IUPAC: REE trifluoride)
Fluocerite-(Ce) (IMA1987 s.p., 1832) 3.AC.15   [no]
Fluocerite-(La) (IMA1987 s.p., 1969) 3.AC.15   
Fluorannite (mica: IMA1999-048) 9.EC.20   [no] (IUPAC: potassium triiron(II) (alumino trisilicate) decaoxy difluoride)
Fluorapatite (apatite: IMA2010 s.p., 1860) 8.BN.05    (IUPAC: pentacalcium fluoro triphosphate)
Fluorapophyllite (apophyllite) 9.EA.15
Fluorapophyllite-(Cs) (IMA2018-108a) 9.EA.15  [no] [no]
Fluorapophyllite-(K) (IMA2013 s.p., IMA1978 s.p., IMA1976-001) 9.EA.15   
Fluorapophyllite-(Na) (IMA2013 s.p., IMA1976-032) 9.EA.15   
Fluorapophyllite-(NH4) (IMA2019-083) 9.EA.  [no] [no]
Fluorarrojadite (arrojadite) 8.BF.05
Fluorarrojadite-(BaFe) (IMA2005-058a) 8.BF.05   [no]
Fluorarrojadite-(BaNa) (IMA2016-075) 8.BF.05  [no] [no]
Fluorbarytolamprophyllite (seidozerite, lamprophyllite: IMA2016-089) 9.B?.  [no] [no]
Fluorbritholite (apatite) 9.AH.25 (IUPAC: (REE,calcium) tri(tetraoxysilicate) fluoride)
Fluorbritholite-(Ce) (IMA1991-027) 9.AH.25   [no]
Fluorbritholite-(Y) (IMA2009-005) 9.AH.25  [no] 
Fluor-buergerite (tourmaline: IMA1965-005 Rd) 9.CK.05   
Fluorcalciobritholite (apatite: IMA2006-010) 9.AH.25   [no]
Fluorcalciomicrolite (microlite, pyrochlore: IMA2012-036) 4.0  [no] [no]
Fluorcalciopyrochlore (pyrochlore, pyrochlore: IMA2013-055) 4.0  [no] [no]
Fluorcalcioroméite (roméite, pyrochlore: IMA2012-093) 4.0  [no] [no]
Fluorcanasite (IMA2007-031) 9.DG.80   [no]
Fluorcaphite (apatite: IMA1996-022) 8.BN.05    (IUPAC: strontium calcium tricalcium fluoro triphosphate)
Fluorcarletonite (IMA2019-038) 9.EB.20  [no] [no]
Fluorcarmoite-(BaNa) (arrojadite: IMA2015-062) 8.0  [no] [no]
Fluorchegemite (humite: IMA2011-112) 9.A?.  [no] [no] (IUPAC: heptacalcium tri(tetraoxysilicate) difluoride)
Fluor-dravite (tourmaline: IMA2009-089) 9.CK.05  [no] [no]
Fluor-elbaite (tourmaline: IMA2011-071) 9.CK.  [no] [no]
Fluorellestadite (apatite: IMA1987-002 Rd) 9.AH.25    (IUPAC: 1/2[decacalcium tritetraoxysilicate trisulfate fluoride])
Fluorite (fluorite: 1873) 3.AB.25    (IUPAC: calcium difluoride)
Fluorkyuygenite (mayenite: IMA2013-043) 4.CC.  [no] [no] (Ca12Al14O32[(H2O)4F2])
Fluorlamprophyllite (seidozerite, lamprophyllite: IMA2013-102) 9.B?.  [no] [no]
Fluor-liddicoatite (tourmaline: IMA1976-041 Rd) 9.CK.05   
Fluorluanshiweiite (mica: IMA2019-053) 9.E  [no] [no]
Fluormayenite (mayenite: IMA2013-019) 4.0  [no] [no] (Ca12Al14O32[☐4F2])
Fluornatrocoulsellite (pyrochlore: IMA2009-070) 3.0  [no] [no] (IUPAC: calcium trisodium aluminium trimagnesium tetradecafluoride)
Fluornatromicrolite (microlite, pyrochlore: IMA1998-018) 4.DH.15   
Fluornatropyrochlore (pyrochlore, pyrochlore: IMA2013-056) 4.DH.  [no] [no]
Fluoro-cannilloite [Ca-amphibole: IMA2012 s.p., fluorocannilloite (IMA2004 s.p.), fluor-cannilloite (IMA1993-033) Rd] 9.DE.   [no]
Fluorocronite (fluorite: IMA2010-023) 3.AB.  [no] [no] (IUPAC: lead difluoride)
Fluoro-edenite [Ca-amphibole: IMA2012 s.p., IMA1994-059 Rd] 9.DE.   [no]
Fluorokinoshitalite (mica: IMA2010-001) 9.EC.35  [no] [no]
Fluoro-leakeite [Na-amphibole: IMA2012 s.p., fluoro-aluminoleakeite (IMA2009-012) Rd] 9.DE.  [no] 
Fluoro-nybøite [Na-amphibole: IMA2012 s.p., fluoronyböite (IMA2002-010) Rd] 9.DE.   [no]
Fluoro-pargasite [Ca-amphibole: IMA2012 s.p., fluoropargasite (IMA2003-050) Rd] 9.DE.   
Fluoro-pedrizite [Li-amphibole: IMA2012 s.p., fluoro-sodic-pedrizite (IMA2004-002) Rd] 9.DE.  [no] [no]
Fluorophlogopite (mica: IMA2006-011) 9.EC.20   [no]
Fluorpyromorphite (IMA2021-120)
Fluoro-richterite [Na-Ca-amphibole: IMA2012 s.p., fluorrichterite (IMA1992-020) Rd] 9.DE.   [no]
Fluoro-riebeckite [Na-amphibole: IMA2012 s.p., fluor-riebeckite (1966) Rd] 9.DE.  [no] [no]
Fluoro-taramite [Na-Ca-amphibole: IMA2012 s.p., fluoro-alumino-magnesiotaramite (IMA2006-025) Rd] 9.DE.   [no]
Fluorotetraferriphlogopite (mica: IMA2010-002) 9.EC.20  [no] [no]
Fluoro-tremolite (Ca-amphibole: IMA2016-018) 9.DE.10  [no] [no]
Fluorowardite (wardite: IMA2012-016) 8.DL.  [no] [no] (IUPAC: sodium trialuminium dihydro difluoro diphosphate dihydrate)
Fluorphosphohedyphane (apatite: IMA2008-068) 8.BN.05  [no] [no] (IUPAC: dicalcium trilead fluoro triphosphate)
Fluor-schorl (tourmaline: IMA2010-067) 9.CK.05  [no] [no]
Fluorsigaiite (apatite: IMA2021-087a) 8.BN.  [no] [no]
Fluorstrophite (apatite: IMA2010 s.p., 1962) 8.BN.05   
Fluor-tsilaisite (tourmaline: IMA2012-044) 9.CK.  [no] [no]
Fluor-uvite (tourmaline: IMA2011 s.p., IMA2000-030a, 1930 Rd) 9.CK.05   
Fluorvesuvianite (vesuvianite: IMA2000-037) 9.BG.35   [no]
Fluorwavellite (wavellite: IMA2015-077) 8.DC.  [no] [no] (IUPAC: trialuminium dihydro fluoro diphosphate pentahydrate)
Flurlite (IMA2014-064) 8.0  [no] [no] (IUPAC: trizinc manganese(II) iron(III) dihydro triphosphate heptawater dihydrate)

Fo – Fu 
Foggite (IMA1973-067) 8.DL.05    (IUPAC: calcium aluminium dihydro phosphate hydrate)
Fogoite-(Y) (seidozerite, rinkite: IMA2014-098) 9.B?.  [no] [no] (IUPAC: dicalcium diyttrium trisodium titanium di(heptaoxo disilicate) (oxofluoride) difluoride)
Foitite (tourmaline: IMA1992-034) 9.CK.05   
Folvikite (IMA2016-026) 6.0  [no] [no]
Fontanite (IMA1991-034) 5.EC.05    (IUPAC: calcium triuranyl dioxo dicarbonate hexahydrate)
Fontarnauite (IMA2009-096a) 6.DA.60  [no] [no]
Foordite (IMA1984-070) 4.DG.15    (IUPAC: tin(II) diniobium hexaoxide)
Footemineite (IMA2006-029) 8.DA.10   [no] (IUPAC: dicalcium pentamanganese(V) tetraberyllium tetrahydro hexaphosphate hexahydrate)
Forêtite (IMA2011-100) 8.0  [no] 
Formanite-(Y) (IMA1987 s.p., 1944) 7.GA.10    (IUPAC: yttrium tantalate)
Formicaite (IMA1998-030) 10.AA.05    (IUPAC: calcium formiate)
Fornacite (fornacite: 1915) 7.FC.10    (IUPAC: copper dilead chromate hydro arsenate)
Forsterite (olivine: 1824) 9.AC.05    (IUPAC: dimagnesium tetraoxysilicate)
Foshagite (Y: 1925) 9.DG.15    (IUPAC: tetracalcium tri(trioxy silicate) dihydroxyl)
Fougèrite (hydrotalcite: IMA2012-B, IMA2003-057 Rd) 4.FL.05   [no] (IUPAC: tetrairon(II) diiron(III) dodecahydroxide carbonate trihydrate, Fe2+:Fe3+ = 2:1) (Note: transforms to lepidocrocite, limonite, goethite in the presence of air.)
Fourmarierite (Y: 1924) 4.GB.25   
FowleriteQ (Y: 1832) 9.DK.05  [no] [no] Note: possibly a variety of rhodonite.
Fraipontite (serpentine: 1927) 9.ED.15   
Francevillite (fritzscheite: IMA2007 s.p., 1957) 4.HB.15    (IUPAC: barium diuranyl divanadate pentahydrate)
Franciscanite (welinite: IMA1985-038) 9.AF.75    (IUPAC: hexamanganese vanadium(V) di(tetraoxysilicate) hexa(oxy,hydroxyl))
Francisite (IMA1989-028) 4.JG.25    (IUPAC: tricopper bismuth dioxo chloro diselenite(IV))
Franckeite (cylindrite: 1893) 2.HF.25b   
Francoanellite (IMA1974-051) 8.CH.25    (IUPAC: tripotassium pentaluminium hexa(hydroxophosphate) diphosphate dodecahydrate)
Françoisite 8.EC.05 (IUPAC: REE triuranyl oxohydro phosphate hexahydrate)
Françoisite-(Ce) (IMA2004-029) 8.EC.05   [no]
Françoisite-(Nd) (IMA1987-041) 8.EC.05   
Franconite (IMA1981-006a) 4.FM.15    (IUPAC: sodium diniobium hydro pentaoxide trihydrate)
Frankamenite (IMA1994-050) 9.DG.90   [no]
Frankdicksonite (fluorite: IMA1974-015) 3.AB.25    (IUPAC: barium difluoride)
Frankhawthorneite (tellurium oxysalt: IMA1993-047) 4.FD.25    (IUPAC: dicopper tellurium(VI) dihydro tetraoxide)
Franklinfurnaceite (IMA1986-034) 9.EC.55   
Franklinite (spinel, spinel: 1819) 4.BB.05    (IUPAC: zinc diiron(III) tetraoxide)
Franklinphilite (stilpnomelane: IMA1990-050) 9.EG.40   
Fransoletite (IMA1982-096) 8.CA.05    (IUPAC: tricalcium diberyllium diphosphate di(hydrogenphosphate) tetrahydrate)
Franksousaite (IMA2021-096)
Franzinite (cancrinite-sodalite: IMA1976-020) 9.FB.05   
Freboldite (nickeline: 1957) 2.CC.05    (IUPAC: cobalt selenide)
Fredrikssonite (ludwigite: IMA1983-040) 6.AB.30    (IUPAC: dimagnesium manganese(III) dioxoborate)
Freedite (IMA1984-012) 4.JB.65    (IUPAC: copper(I) octalead pentachloro diarsenite(III) trioxide)
Freieslebenite (Y: 1845) 2.JB.15    (IUPAC: silver lead antimonide trisulfide)
Freitalite (IMA2019-116) 10.0  [no] [no] (IUPAC: anthracene)
Fresnoite (IMA1964-012) 9.BE.15    (IUPAC: dibarium titanium oxo heptaoxodisilicate)
Freudenbergite (IMA1967 s.p., 1961) 4.CC.10    (IUPAC: sodium (trititanium(IV) iron(III)) octaoxide)
Friedelite (pyrosmalite: 1876) 9.EE.10    (IUPAC: octamanganese(II) pentadecaoxy hexasilicate decahydroxyl)
Friedrichbeckeite (milarite: IMA2008-019) 9.CM.   
Friedrichite (meneghinite: IMA1977-031) 2.HB.05a    (Cu5Pb5Bi7S18)
Fritzscheite (fritzscheite: 1865) 4.HB.15   
Frohbergite (marcasite: 1947) 2.EB.10a    (IUPAC: iron ditelluride)
Frolovite (Y: 1957) 6.AC.20    (IUPAC: calcium di[tetrahydro borate])
Frondelite (rockbridgeite: 1949) 8.BC.10    (IUPAC: manganese(II) tetrairon(III) pentahydro triphosphate)
Froodite (Y: 1958) 2.AC.45a    (IUPAC: lead dibismuthide)
Fuenzalidaite (IMA1993-021) 7.DG.40   
Fuettererite (tellurium oxysalt: IMA2011-111) 7.A?.  [no] [no] (IUPAC: trilead hexacopper(II) heptahydro pentachloro tellurium(VI) hexaoxide)
Fukalite (IMA1976-003) 9.DQ.05    (IUPAC: tetracalcium disilicate hexaoxy carbonate dihydroxyl)
Fukuchilite (pyrite: IMA1967-009) 2.EB.05a    (IUPAC: tricopper iron octasulfide) 
Fulbrightite (IMA2019-032 ) 8.0  [no] [no] (IUPAC: calcium di(oxovanadate(IV)) diarsenate tetrahydrate)
Fülöppite (plagionite: 1929) 2.HC.10a    (IUPAC: trilead octaantimonide pentadecasulfide)
Furongite (IMA1982 s.p., 1976) 8.EB.50   
Furutobeite (IMA1978-040) 2.BE.10

External links
IMA Database of Mineral Properties/ RRUFF Project
Mindat.org - The Mineral Database
Webmineral.com
Mineralatlas.eu minerals F and G